Manahawkin Wildlife Management Area (Manahawkin Bottomland Hardwood Forest) is a  wildlife management area near Manahawkin, Stafford Township, Ocean County, New Jersey. It was designated a National Natural Landmark in January 1976.  It is known for its mature bottomland hardwood forest which contains examples of American sweetgum, red maple and black gum trees.

References

External links
 
Map of area New Jersey Division of Fish and Wildlife

National Natural Landmarks in New Jersey
Protected areas of Ocean County, New Jersey
Stafford Township, New Jersey
Wildlife management areas of New Jersey